Massachusetts Correctional Institution – Plymouth or MCI - Plymouth is a minimum-security prison facility located in the Myles Standish State Forest in Plymouth, Massachusetts.  It is not to be confused with much larger Plymouth County Correctional Facility, also located in Plymouth, which has housed a number of celebrity inmates including Survivor winner Richard Hatch.

Prison Mailing Address
MCI-Plymouth 
Myles Standish Forest 
PO Box 207 
South Carver, MA 02366

1952 establishments in Massachusetts
Plymouth
Buildings and structures in Plymouth, Massachusetts